Fragments of a Lucky Break is a 1998 album by Trumans Water.  The CD was released on the Emperor Jones label and the vinyl was released on the Infinite Chug label.  It was their first album in several years to include Glen Galloway, who left the band in 1994 to form Soul-Junk.

Critical reception
AllMusic's Stephen Cramer called the album "some of [the band's] most inspired and cohesive work." Portland Mercury deemed it a "modern classic," writing that it approaches "the raw materials of guitar rock with a cubist’s perspective, creating subtly complex structures full of impossible angles and complex formulas that miraculously balance out every time."

Track listing 
 "Obstacle of Habit" - 4:04
 "Lyrical Nozzle" - 2:39
 "Strat-As-Fear" - 2:09
 "Wealth In a Flask" - 5:53
 "Sky Landslide" - 3:36
 "Your Courage" - 4:34
 "Woed World Whirlers" - 2:27
 "Tiny World With the Jitters" - 4:16
 "Mall Removal Machine" - 3:39
 "60 Seconds Over Medium" - 4:58
 "Worth of Wait" - 2:23
 "Matter Smasher" - 0:06
 "Water for a Thirsty City" - 3:54
 "Someday You'll Be King" (MX-80 Sound cover) - 3:24
 "All Eye And Movement" - 4:15

References

1998 albums
Trumans Water albums